Telelombardia is a Milan-based Italian local television network that offer entertainment programs, news and weather bulletins, sports and political debates, variety shows and paid programming.

See also 
 Qui studio a voi stadio

External links 
Telelombardia Official Website 

Television channels and stations established in 2004
Free-to-air
Television networks in Italy
Companies based in Milan
Italian-language television networks
Television channels and stations established in 1974
Mass media in Milan